Karl Rumbold (30 October 1893 – 1971) was an Austrian football player and manager. A defender, he played in one match for the Austria national team in 1913.

References

External links

 

1893 births
1971 deaths
Austrian footballers
Footballers from Vienna
Association football defenders
Austria international footballers
First Vienna FC players
Austrian football managers
Alemannia Aachen managers
Genoa C.F.C. managers
Austrian expatriate football managers
Austrian expatriate sportspeople in Italy
Expatriate football managers in Italy